Bulbophyllum porphyrotriche is a species of orchid in the genus Bulbophyllum.

References
The Bulbophyllum-Checklist
The internet Orchid species Photo Encyclopedia

porphyrotriche